General Slack may refer to:

James R. Slack (1818–1881), Union Army brigadier general and brevet major general
Jerald D. Slack (born 1936), U.S. Air National Guard major general
William Y. Slack (1816–1862), Missouri State Guard brigadier general in the American Civil War